The Tecolutla River is a river in the state of Veracruz in Mexico, and the main drainage of the historical and cultural region of Totonacapan. It is principally fed by four rivers that rise in the Sierra Norte de Puebla: from north to south, they are the Necaxa, the Lajajalpan (or Laxaxalpan), the Tecuantepec and the Apulco.

This arroyo flows into the Coyuca River, which in turn drains into the Apulco.

The first important hydroelectric facilities in Mexico were built in the Tecolutla watershed on the Necaxa River. Nevertheless, the Tecolutla is considered one of the most well-preserved rivers in the state of Veracruz and its floodplains are agriculturally productive. Vanilla may have been first cultivated by the Totonac in this area and has been an important part of their culture for centuries.

References

Rivers of Veracruz
Drainage basins of the Gulf of Mexico